Perundurai is a Special Grade Town Panchayat  in Erode district in the Indian state of Tamil Nadu. Perundurai is the only special grade town panchayat among 42 in the district. Perundurai has developed as the industrial center with SIPCOT Industrial Estate and SEZ Complex. It is the Asia's Second largest SIPCOT.

Perundurai has been proposed to be developed as a Satellite Town for Erode, as per Erode Master Plan-1996.

Geography
Perundurai is located on National Highway 544, connecting Salem with Cochin. It is located 18 kilometres from Erode Central Bus Terminus via Perundurai Road, and 36 kilometres from Tiruppur and 80 kilometres from Coimbatore and Salem and 32 kilometres from Kangayam, respectively.

Demographics
 India census, Perundurai had a population of 16,973. Females constitute 50% of the population. Perundurai has an average literacy rate of 72%, higher than the national average of 59.5%. Male literacy is 80%, and female literacy is 65%. In Perundurai, 9% of the population is under 6 years.

Economy
Perundurai SIPCOT was established by Tamil Nadu in July, 2000, on around 2000 acres. The population increased in the neighbourhood because of textile industries relocating from Tirupur, Coimbatore and Erode Main to Perundurai. SIPCOT acquired another  in 2007. Parryware Roca started their manufacturing plant in 2006, their fourth in India. IRTT medical college and hospital run by Tamil Nadu State Transport Corporation is located there. The state government converted IRT medical college into the Government Erode Medical College and Hospital.

Politics
Perundurai assembly constituency is part of Tirupur (Lok Sabha constituency) Tirupur is a neighbouring district.

Education

Medical College
Government Erode Medical College
 K M R College of Pharmacy

Engineering Colleges
Kongu Engineering College  
Erode Sengunthar Engineering College
Nandha Engineering College
Surya Engineering College

Arts and Science College 
 Kongu Arts and Science College
 Nandha Arts and Science College

Schools
Government Boys Higher Secondary School
Government Girls Higher Secondary School
Karunya Vidya Bhavan Matriculation School, Slatter Nagar 
Kongu Vellaler Matric Higher Secondary School
Kalaivani Kalvi Nilayam Matric School, Thingalur
Seenapuram Kongu Vellaler Polytechnic College
Shree Swami Vivekananda Matriculation Higher Secondary School
Green Garden Girls Matriculation Higher Secondary School
Shri Mahaa School
Shri Ganga Higher Secondary School 
The Richmond Matric Higher Secondary School
Government Higher Secondary School, Seenapuram
sagar international Higher Secondary School

Infrastructure
The town hosts the Erode Rural DSP Office, Perundurai Police station, Court, and Subtreasury office. The town Panchayat Offices and Perundurai Taluk office are there. The weekly market operates on Sundays. The four theaters are Devichitra, Nallappas, Murugan, and Mahalakshmi.

Health care 
A government hospital is there.

Transport
A bus stand reaches Erode, Coimbatore, Tirupur, and Salem.

References

Cities and towns in Erode district